Truba Group of Institutes at Bhopal, Madhya Pradesh, India is a group of two engineering institutes, Truba Institute of Engineering and Information Technology and Truba College of Science & Technology, one pharmacy institute, Truba Institute of Pharmacy and a management institute, Truba Institute of Science and Commerce.
Truba Edu Society is also the parent society of Sage University(Truba) Indore. 
The name "Truba" is derived from the name of lord Tirupati Balaji.

Truba Group of Institutes is affiliated with Rajiv Gandhi Proudyogiki Vishwavidyalaya (RGPV), Bhopal, and offers undergraduate and postgraduate courses in various fields of study, including engineering, management, pharmacy, computer applications, and education.

History 
Truba Group of Institutes has been set up by Truba Advance Science Kombine (TASK) in 2001.

References

External links
 
Placements at Truba

2005 establishments in Madhya Pradesh
Educational institutions established in 2005
Engineering colleges in Madhya Pradesh
Universities and colleges in Bhopal